EMMS may refer to:

 Emms, a surname (including a list of people with the name)
 EMMS (media player), media player software for Emacs
 EMMS International, originally the Edinburgh Medical Missionary Society

See also 
 EMM (disambiguation)